Melrose–Rugby Historic District is a national historic district located in the Melrose–Rugby neighborhood of Roanoke, Virginia.  It encompasses 111 contributing buildings and 2 contributing objects in a planned residential subdivision, with most of the dwellings being built between the late 1910s and late 1940s.  It is a primarily residential district with single-family dwellings. The houses include American Craftsman-style bungalow, American Foursquare, and Cape Cod style.

It was listed on the National Register of Historic Places in 2013.

References

Historic districts on the National Register of Historic Places in Virginia
Houses on the National Register of Historic Places in Virginia
Houses in Roanoke, Virginia
National Register of Historic Places in Roanoke, Virginia